Ride is the second studio album by Filipino-American singer Billy Crawford. It was released by V2 Records on July 8, 2002. Crawford worked with a variety of musicians on the album, including Bloodshy & Avant, Rob Fusari, Wayne Hector, Eve Nelson, Steve Robson, and Soulshock & Karlin. Following the commercial failure of lead single "When You're in Love with Someone" in the United States, the domestic release of Ride was cancelled. Elsewhere, it entered the top ten on the French Albums Chart. Ride produced the number-one hit "Trackin'" as well as three additional singles that followed, along with a special edition re-release in 2003.

Track listing

Charts

Weekly charts

Year-end charts

Certifications

References 

2002 albums
Billy Crawford albums
V2 Records albums